Halftime Magazine, which premiered in July 2007, is a glossy print magazine that highlights the “sights, sounds and spirit of the marching arts”. 
Halftime Magazine is a publication of Muse Media, LLC, based in Cincinnati, Ohio. The first issue printed was the July/August 2007 issue. The magazine focuses on music careers, college preparation and college football's bowl games.

This bimonthly lifestyle magazine connects high school and college musician-athletes through shared experiences about competitions, school spirit, and band traditions with profiles, first-person accounts and thought-provoking feature stories. In addition, the publication provides tips to enhance students’ musical and marching skills as well as connect the band community through news, events calendars and product reviews. It covers high school marching bands, college marching bands, drum corps, winter guards, indoor drum line and all-age ensembles.

References

External links
 

2007 establishments in Ohio
Bimonthly magazines published in the United States
Lifestyle magazines published in the United States
Music magazines published in the United States
Magazines established in 2007
Magazines published in Cincinnati